Villamaderne is a town in Basque Country, northern Spain. It is located in the path of several routes frequented since remote times by the valley of Valdegovia, one of the intermediate lands that links the plateau with the sea. By being close to Salinas de Añana it started to take part in the network of roads salt producers. Bellogin is also inside the council of the village.

Population

Tourism 

Parish church

The parish church of Villamaderne is dedicated to San Millán. The temple owns numerous Romanesque remains in its two covers, one of them today bricked up. In the start of the century, the temple was extended, hiding multiple attributes of the ancient construction. Fortunately, due to the recent restoration carried out, they have been able to recover them. The most significant part of the parish temple is the romance bell gable.

Palace-tower

The most important component of the house is the beautiful and well drawn archery that unfolds in the angle of the building, giving way to a cozy open hallway that opens to the south through four doors and to the east by other three, all of them under arches. On the other hand, the walls are made by bricks and masonry.

The mill

The mill is accessed by a descending path that comes up in front of the hermitage, in the other side of the road. The mill is located there strategically, sheltering the curve of the bed of the river, what is used as supplies to give motor strength.

Hermitage

The hermitage of Santa Lucia, which is next to the road and closed to one of the entrance paths of the centre of the village, shows a usual construction of the rural area. Nevertheless, it shows a distinctive feature which is a little arcade that can be entered under a big semicircular arc.

The White Inn

The White Inn or the Inn of Burguillos is located next to the national road and closed to other inns such as the ones located in Cárcamo. In the walls of the front entrance there are used different materials such as bricks, wood and stones.

Weather, vegetation and fauna 

Its oceanic or transitional climate dictates the annual fluctuations in heat. The abundant rainfall throughout the year favours the colour, vegetation and particular “atmosphere” prevalent in Valdegovía. The region’s vegetation is particularly characterised by pinewoods of albar pine, kermes oak, gall oak and beech. There are also other very typical vegetation types such as scrub, rock plants and vegetation associated with natural springs and still water. The most common mammals in the region are the roe deer, wild boar, fox and hare.

References

External links 
Official website
Official website (in Basque)

Populated places in the Basque Country (autonomous community)